The Navajo-Hopi Observer is a weekly newspaper serving the Hopi and Navajo nations and the city of Flagstaff in northern Arizona.

External links
 Official website
 Western Newspapers subsidiary profile of the Navajo-Hopi Observer

Flagstaff, Arizona
Hopi culture
Native American newspapers
Navajo mass media
Newspapers published in Arizona